Navraj may refer to:

 Navraj Hans, Indian musical artist
 Nav (rapper) (Navraj Singh Goraya; born 1989), Canadian rapper, record producer, and singer

See also
 Navaraj Rawat (born 1964), Nepali communist politician and member of the House of Representatives of the federal parliament of Nepal
 Nuvraj Bassi (born 1983), defensive tackle in the Canadian Football League
 Nav Raj Dhami, Nepalese politician